Pterostylis daintreana, commonly known as Daintree's greenhood, is a species of orchid endemic to eastern Australia. The non-flowering plants have a rosette of leaves on short stalks but flowering plants have up to ten flowers with rosettes on the side of the flowering spike. The flowers are translucent white with dark green lines and long, downcurved lateral sepals.

Description
The dorsal sepal and petals are fused, forming a hood or "galea" over the column. Flowering occurs from January to July.

Taxonomy and naming
Pterostylis daintreana was first formally described in 1873 by George Bentham, assisted by Ferdinand von Mueller, from a specimen collected by Richard Daintree near Sydney. The description was published in Flora Australiensis. The specific epithet (daintreana) honours the collector of the type specimen.

Distribution and habitat
Daintree's greenhood grows on the coast and tablelands of New South Wales and southern Queensland among small shrubs or on mossy rocks.

References

daintreana
Endemic orchids of Australia
Orchids of New South Wales
Orchids of Queensland
Plants described in 1943